Scărlăteşti may refer to several villages in Romania:

 Scărlăteşti, a village in Cireşu Commune, Brăila County
 Scărlăteşti, a village in Largu Commune, Buzău County